David Joseph Nolan (born 24 February 1968) is an English former professional footballer who played as a midfielder in the Football League for Chester City. He also played non-league football for Barrow, Hyde United (in two spells, the second of which was as player-manager), Runcorn, Droylsden and Marine.

References

1968 births
Living people
English footballers
Association football midfielders
Chester City F.C. players
Barrow A.F.C. players
Hyde United F.C. players
Runcorn F.C. Halton players
Droylsden F.C. players
Marine F.C. players
English Football League players
National League (English football) players
Northern Premier League players